The Women's 50m Freestyle event at the 2007 Pan American Games took place at the Maria Lenk Aquatic Park in Rio de Janeiro, Brazil, with the final being swum on July 18.

Medalists

Records

Results

Notes

References
For the Record, Swimming World Magazine, September 2007 (p. 48+49)
Official Results
aquariumnatacao

Freestyle, Women's 50m
2007 in women's swimming